is a railway station on the Honshi-Bisan Line in Kurashiki, Okayama Prefecture, Japan, jointly operated by West Japan Railway Company (JR West) and Shikoku Railway Company (JR Shikoku).

Lines
Kojima Station is served by the Honshi-Bisan Line, and is the last stop in Honshu before the Great Seto Bridge for the Island of Shikoku.

Station Layout
Kojima Station has 2 platforms that serve 4 tracks

Adjacent stations

History
The station opened on 20 March 1988.

See also
List of railway stations in Japan

References

External links
Kojima Station (JR West)

Railway stations in Okayama Prefecture
Stations of West Japan Railway Company
Railway stations in Japan opened in 1988